Helen Nordeide Fløisand (born 25 October 1952) is a Norwegian politician for the Christian Democratic Party.

In 1999 Fløisand was elected deputy county mayor (fylkesvaraordfører) of Hordaland, succeeding Conservative Øyvind Halleraker. Another Conservative Tom-Christer Nilsen replaced Fløisand following the 2003 election.

She served as a deputy representative to the Norwegian Parliament from Hordaland during the terms 1993–1997 and 1997–2001.

References

1952 births
Living people
Christian Democratic Party (Norway) politicians
Deputy members of the Storting
Hordaland politicians
Women members of the Storting